Pedro Vaz may refer to:
 Pedro Vaz, Cape Verde, a settlement in Cape Verde
 Pedro Vaz Marinheiro, Portuguese nobleman and colonizer of the Azores Islands
 Pedro Vaz (diplomat) (1963–2012), Uruguayan diplomat